Lore Kadden Lindenfeld (April 27, 1921 – April 8, 2010) was a German-American textile designer. She taught visual arts at Middlesex County College. Her work has been exhibited in group and solo exhibitions internationally.

Life and education

Lore Kadden Lindenfeld was born in Wuppertal, Germany, to parents Frieda and Alfred Kadden. She attended school at the Art Academy in Düsseldorf, where she studied fashion design; however, she was shortly forced to flee to Holland due to Nazi rule. A year later, her family moved to the United States where she began a living as a seamstress and salesperson. Lore took classes at Harvard and attended the Institute for Social Progress at Wellesley College as well. 

From 1945 to 1948 she attended Black Mountain College, graduating with a degree in Weaving and Textile Design. 

She earned a master's degree in Creative Arts Education from Rutgers University in 1982.

Career

Lore's first post-graduate employment was as a design assistant in a textile plant in New York where she helped design women's coats and dresses. She was one of the first women to become an industrial textile designer. She then became a designer for Kanmak Textiles. Lore soon devoted her time raising her two children and as an independent weaver, creating pieces that represented her founded knowledge of patterns, colors, and designs. She started the weaving department and was a faculty member in the Visual Arts department at Middlesex County College from 1968 to 1986 and taught weaving at the Princeton Adult School for many years.

Artistic significance

Lore focused primarily on weaving and fiber designs, using plastic raffia and wool fibers or ribbons. She also created some pieces using paper and ink. Her work has made appearances in exhibits throughout the world, and her work is held in the collections of the Black Mountain College Museum + Arts Center, the Fashion Institute of Technology, the Josef and Anni Albers Foundation, the Museum of Arts and Design, the National Museum of American Art, the Newark Museum of Art, the New Jersey State Museum, Rider University Art Collection, the Paley Design Center, and in private collections.

Major works

 Totem. 1981, wool, ribbons, plastic, raffia
 Triptych. 1982, wool, nylon, netting, plastic raffia
 Sado Island. 1991, polyester, Japanese paper, netting, yarn stitching and drawing
 Sado Island, Remembered Images. 1994, polyester, Japanese paper, netting, ink stitching, and drawing
 Patterns of Growth. 1998
 Transparent Forest. 1999

Solo exhibitions 

 Lore Lindenfeld, A Journey in Fiberarts, Princeton Day School, Princeton, NJ, 1999
 Lore Kadden Lindenfeld: A Life in Textiles, Black Mountain College Museum + Arts Center, Asheville, North Carolina, 1997
 Fibergraphics: Remembered Images, Newark Museum of Art, 1993
 Dialogue: Lindenfeld + Lindenfeld at ArtisTree, South Pomfret, Vermont
 Fiber Collage, Bargeron Gallery, Washington Crossing, PA, 1990
 Places, Spaces, and Seasons, Rider University, Lawrenceville, NJ, 1988
 Perception in Fiber, New Jersey State Museum, Trenton, NJ, 1984
 Woven Tapestries, Walters Art Gallery, Rutgers University, New Brunswick, NJ; and Henry Chauncey Conference Center, Princeton, NJ, 1982 
 American Craft Gallery (later Hadler Gallery), New York, NY (with Marion Levinston), 1974
 New Jersey State Museum, Trenton, NJ (with Marion Levinston), 1973

References

1921 births
2010 deaths
Women textile artists
American textile artists
German emigrants to the United States
German textile artists
20th-century American women artists
21st-century American women artists